is a Japanese voice actress.

Filmography

Anime

Film

Video games

Other dubbing

References

External links 
 

Living people
1969 births
20th-century Japanese actresses
21st-century Japanese actresses
Japanese voice actresses
Ken Production voice actors